Sapient means to be able to reflect on memories, and or possessing wisdom and may refer to:
 Brian Sapient, co-founder of atheist activist group Rational Response Squad
 SAPIENT, a scholarship programme
 Publicis Sapient, a digital consulting firm

See also
 Sapiens (disambiguation)
 Sapient pearwood, a magical plant in Terry Pratchett's Discworld universe; see The Luggage
 Sapientia (disambiguation)
 Sapiential Books, a subset of the books of the Hebrew Bible